Tentación (Spanish for Temptation) is the third studio album by Cuban-American singer Ana (under the pseudonym Mía), released by Univision Records in 2003. Produced by renowned Latin musician and producer Rudy Pérez, it features the singles "Te Tengo Que Aprender a Olvidar" and "Convéncete". The album garnered Mía a Best New Artist of the Year nomination at the Premio Lo Nuestro 2004.

Track listing

Personnel 
 Rudy Pérez – guitar, backing vocals
 Dan Warner – guitar
 Manny López – guitar
 Piero Gemelli – guitar
 Beppe Gemelli – keyboards, drums
 Clay Perry – keyboards
 Joel Numa – keyboards
 Manny López – keyboards
 Julio Hernandez – bass
 Lee Levin – drums
 Orlando Hernández – drums
 Edwin Bonilla – percussion
 Richard Bravo – percussion
 Ed Calle – saxophone
 Teddy Mulet – trumpet, trombone
 Jim Hacker – trumpet
 John Kricker – trombone 
 Catalina Rodríguez – backing vocals
 Jeannie Cruz – backing vocals
 Ramiro Teran – backing vocals
 Vicky Echeverri – backing vocals
 Wendy Pedersen – backing vocals
 Miami Symphonic Strings – orchestra

References

External links 
 

2003 albums
Spanish-language albums
Univision Records albums